Chaetorellia isais is a species of tephritid or fruit flies in the genus Chaetorellia of the family Tephritidae.

Distribution
Lebanon & Russia, Kazakhstan, China.

References

Tephritinae
Insects described in 1937
Diptera of Asia